Greg Hayne (born 2 October 1971) is an Australian former cricketer. He played seven first-class matches for New South Wales in 1999/00.

See also
 List of New South Wales representative cricketers

References

External links
 

1971 births
Living people
Australian cricketers
New South Wales cricketers
People from Moree, New South Wales
Cricketers from New South Wales